Deknni (also spelled dekni, dekṇi, dekhṇi) is a semi classical Goan dance form. The plural of dekṇi in Konkani remains the same.

Overview 
One of the earliest  which may be dated around 1869 is Kuxttoba in which he is called "heir to India and terror of Goa", implying resistance to Portuguese rule. Kuxttoba was a member of the Salekar branch of the Rane family. Information about his birth, the reason and the course of his rebellion and the manner of his end are vague. He rebelled as an individual against the rule of the Portuguese in Goa but he presented no concept for a free Goa.

One of the best known Deknni songs is Hanv Saiba Poltodi Vetam by Carlos Eugenio Ferreira (1860–1932) first published in Paris in 1895 and then in Goa in 1926 by Tipografia Rangel. The song was adapted by Raj Kapoor as Na mangoon sona chandi in his Hindi movie Bobby. The story that is depicted in this song is about two temple dancers who want to go for Damu's wedding and they approach the boatman to ferry them across the river. The boatman says, "No! The river is rough!" The dancers offer the boatman their gold jewellery; but the boatman is still firm. "No!" he says. So the dancers dance for the boatman and this time he ferries them across the river.

Other deknni songs are:
 
 
 
 Voddekara

See also
Mando
Dulpod
Fugdi

Citations

References

External links
Collection of Dekhnni songs

Goan dances
Indian folk dances
Classical dance genres of India